The Copa Rommel Fernández 2010 season (officially "XIV Copa Rommel Fernández") started on January 10, 2010.

2010 teams

Zone 1

Zone 2

Zone 3

Zone 4

Regular round

Zone 1

Zone 2

Zone 3

Zone 4

Copa Rommel Fernández seasons
3